Macau Container Port is a small container port facility in Macau, China. The port is located next to Macau International Airport.

History
The port was opened in 1991.

See also
 Kai Ho Port
 Transport in Macau

References

1991 establishments in Macau
Ports and harbours of Macau